Megasis hyrcanella is a species of snout moth in the genus Megasis. It was described by Ragonot in 1893, and is known from Iran. The species epithet is derived from Hyrcania, a satrapy which previously existed within present-day Iran.

References

Moths described in 1893
Phycitini